José Constantino Nalda García (born 5 August 1939) is a Spanish politician and member of the Spanish Socialist Workers' Party (PSOE) who served as President of the Junta of Castile and León from November 1986 to July 1987.

References

Presidents of the Junta of Castile and León
Members of the 1st Cortes of Castile and León
Spanish Socialist Workers' Party politicians
1939 births
Living people
Valladolid city councillors
People from Valladolid